Boulet is a French surname. Notable people with the surname include:

 Gerry Boulet (1946–1990), Canadian rock singer and lead vocal of Offenbach
 Julie Boulet (born 1959), Canadian politician and Quebec provincial Cabinet minister
 Lionel Boulet (1919–1996), Canadian engineer
 Magdalena Lewy-Boulet (born 1973), American runner
 Sergio Alvarez Boulet, Cuban weightlifter
 Jonathan Boulet, Australian born musician, self-titled and drummer for 'Parades'

Fictional characters:
 Jeanie Boulet, a character from the television series ER

French-language surnames